Araceli Torres Flores (born 17 October 1960) is a Mexican politician affiliated with the Labor Party. As of 2013 she served as Deputy of the LXII Legislature of the Mexican Congress representing Veracruz.

References

1960 births
Living people
Politicians from the State of Mexico
Women members of the Chamber of Deputies (Mexico)
Labor Party (Mexico) politicians
21st-century Mexican politicians
21st-century Mexican women politicians
Deputies of the LXII Legislature of Mexico
Members of the Chamber of Deputies (Mexico) for Veracruz